SS Leicester was a passenger and cargo vessel built for the Manchester, Sheffield and Lincolnshire Railway in 1891.

History
The ship was built by Earle's Shipbuilding in Hull and launched on 8 June 1891 by Mrs. Alford Green, wife of Major Alford Green of the Manchester, Sheffield and Lincolnshire Railway. Until 1891, the company had named its vessels after stations on its network, but the four vessels launched in 1891 were named after stations which were on the planned line to London.

In 1897 the MS and LR became  the Great Central Railway. On 8 May 1913, the Royal Navy destroyer  struck Leicester in the dock at Grimsby and damaged her.

References

1891 ships
Steamships of the United Kingdom
Ships built on the Humber
Ships of the Manchester, Sheffield and Lincolnshire Railway
Ships of the Great Central Railway
Maritime incidents in 1913
Maritime incidents in 1916
Ships sunk by mines
World War I shipwrecks in the English Channel